Lijewski is a Polish surname. Notable people with the surname include:

Christy Lijewski (born 1981), American comic book artist and illustrator 
Krzysztof Lijewski (born 1983), Polish handball player 
Marcin Lijewski (born 1977), Polish handball player

Polish-language surnames